Donner may refer to:

Places
 Donner (crater), a lunar crater
 Mount Donner, on Vancouver Island, British Columbia, Canada
 Donner, California, an unincorporated community near Donner Pass, United States
 Donner Lake, in California
 Donner Memorial State Park, site of the Donner Camp, where the Donner party was trapped by snow
 Donner Pass
 Donner Ski Ranch on Donner Summit, California
 Donner, Louisiana, an unincorporated community

Other uses
 Donner (surname)
 USS Donner (LSD-20), a United States naval ship
 Donner Prize, a Canadian book award
 Donner the Reindeer or Donder, one of Santa Claus's reindeer
 Donner Metals Ltd., a Canadian mining company
 Donner, the German name for Thor, a god in Norse mythology
 Donner, a superheroine in Milestone Media comic books
 Donner, a character in Artist Descending a Staircase
 Donner Block, a wing of William Hulme's Grammar School in northern England
 Donner Laboratory, a laboratory at University of California, Berkeley
 Donner Professor, an academic title of the William H. Donner Foundation
 Donner Party, an ill-fated pioneer group bound for California in 1846

See also
 Donar (disambiguation)
 Doner (disambiguation)
 Donner und Blitzen River in Oregon, United States
 Donner woodrush or Luzula subcongesta
 Palmer v Donner, an 1868 United States Supreme Court case
 Sir Magnus Donners, a character in the A Dance to the Music of Time cycle of novels by Anthony Powell